Saibaa Maudo Keita (born 22 October 1997) is a Norwegian professional footballer who plays as a forward for Greek club Panionios.

Personal life
Born in Norway, Keita is of Gambian descent.

Career statistics

References

1997 births
Living people
Norwegian people of Gambian descent
Footballers from Oslo
Norwegian footballers
Association football forwards
Norwegian Second Division players
Liga II players
Veikkausliiga players
Strømsgodset Toppfotball players
Arka Gdynia players
Egersunds IK players
U.S. Triestina Calcio 1918 players
ACS Poli Timișoara players
FC U Craiova 1948 players
FC Haka players
Norwegian expatriate footballers
Norwegian expatriate sportspeople in Poland
Expatriate footballers in Poland
Norwegian expatriate sportspeople in Italy
Expatriate footballers in Italy
Norwegian expatriate sportspeople in Romania
Expatriate footballers in Romania
Norwegian expatriate sportspeople in Finland
Expatriate footballers in Finland